Zinc finger protein 562 is a protein that in humans is encoded by the ZNF562 gene.

References

Further reading 

Human proteins